Otocinclus bororo is a species of armoured catfish native to the upper Paraguay river basin in South America. It is also known as the Paraguay dwarf sucker.

Otocinclus bororo is found in the upper Paraguay river basin including the Paraguay, La Plata and Paraná rivers. The type locality of the species is a stream in Barra do Bugres, Mato Grosso, Brazil. Females are larger than males and reach an average adult size of 31 mm (1.2'').

References

Hypoptopomatini
Taxa named by Scott Allen Schaefer
Fish described in 1997